Indochine, sur les traces d’une mère is a 2010 documentary film.

Synopsis
Between 1946 and 1954, more than 60,000 African soldiers were sent to the Far East to fight against the Viet Minh. Many unions between Vietnamese women and African soldiers took place, and children were born. Some stayed with their mothers, but others were taken back to Africa. Through the story of Christophe, a 58-year-old Afro-Asian, Idrissou Mora-Kpai not only tells the story of these children of mixed heritage, but also the unnatural fight in which colonized Africans stood against the Vietnamese who were fighting for their independence.

Awards
Fespaco 2011

References

External links 
 

Beninese documentary films
Creative Commons-licensed documentary films
French documentary films
2010 films
2010 documentary films
2010s French films